Dorchester College or The Old College was turned into an Orthodox Theological College to serve the Serbian Orthodox Church in the diaspora on the initiative of the Bishop of Gibraltar in Europe, the Right Reverend Harold Buxton. After World War II, the Bishop of Gibraltar went to visit an overcrowded refugee camp in the town of Eboli near Salerno, where he was moved by the devotion of the internees who fought the German occupiers and Tito-led communists in Yugoslavia. There, General Miodrag Damjanović introduced Serbian theologian Dimitrije Najdanović to the Bishop of Gibraltar in Europe. In turn, Najdanović and Right Reverend Buxton discussed with 40 students and priests the possibility of forming a clergy training college in the village of Dorchester on Thames, seeing that a nucleus was there.

The college served its missionary purpose from 1885 from the time of Darwell Stone until the 1960s.

Later, it was converted for other uses.

References 

Buildings and structures in Oxfordshire
Grade II listed buildings in Oxfordshire
South Oxfordshire District